Clare Azzopardi (5 July 1977) is a Maltese author who writes for both adults and younger readers.

Life 
Born in St. Julian's, Malta, she eventually went on to study at the University of Malta and then received a master's degree in literacy from the University of Sheffield. She is the head of Department of Maltese at G. F. Abela Junior College.

Works 
Azzopardi’s poetry and short stories, written in Maltese, have appeared in various anthologies. Her work has appeared in translation in various literary periodicals, including In Focus, Transcript, Words without Borders, West 47, Lettre International (Hungary) and Kulturas Forms. 

In 2005, Azzopardi published Others, Across, two short stories translated into English, and, in 2006, a collection of short stories in Maltese, Il-Linja l-Ħadra ("The Green Line"). She has also written plays, including In-Nisa Jafu Kif, Pretty Lisa and L-Interdett Taħt is-Sodda which was published in French (Éditions Théatrales) and in Arabic (I-ACT) . She has participated in various literary festivals including the Jaipur Literature Festival and the vRIsak festival in Rijeka.

List of publications

Children 
 Meta l-Milied ma Ġiex
 Ġużeppina
 Hemm dal-post telqulu l-kuluri
 Mingu
 Il-Qtates ta' max-xatt
 Is-Sinjura Klaws
 Senduq Kuluri/Buffuri
 Senduq Riżorsi għall-Għalliema
 Esperimenti tax-xjenza (100 attivita)
 Kalejdoskopju 3-6
 1.MT, 2.MT, 3.MT, 4.MT
 Terramaxka
 Tikka Malti 1a,1b, 2a, 2b, 3a, 3b, 4a, 4b
 Tikka Qari (series)

Poetry and prose for adults 
 Others, across
 Il-Linja l-Ħadra
 Din Mhix Tazza
 Klijenti Antipatici u Kapuccini Kesħin
 Għaraq Xort'Oħra
 Kulħadd ħalla isem warajh
 L-Art tal-Kliem
 Castillo

Translations 
 Le Loup Qui Voulait Changer de Couleur
 Le Loup Qui ne Voulait Plus Marcher
 Berlingot est un Superhéros
 Zafo Le Petit Pirate
 Séraphin, Le Prince Des Dauphins
 Rosetta Banana N'est Pas Craca
 Crocky Le Crocodile A Mal Aux Dents
 Camille Veut Une Nouvelle Famille
 Les Bêtises de Manon 
 Manon est Malade
 Le Dent de Manon
 L'Anniversaire de Manon
 Manon s'Habille Toute Seule
 La Grande Fabrique Des Mots
 Le Loup qui Avait Peur De Son Ombre
 Le Loup Qui S'amait Beaucoup Trop
 Le Loup Qui Decouvrait Le Pays Des Contes
 Le Loup Qui Encûetait au Musée
 P'tit loup va sur le pot
 P'tit loup n'aime que les pâtes

Theatre 
 L-Esperimenti ta' Fiona
 L-Interdett taħt is-Sodda
 In-Nisa Maltin Jafu Kif
 Pretty Lisa

Awards 
In 2011 and 2012 she was nominated for the Astrid Lindgren Memorial Award in 2011 and 2012. In 2015 and 2016 her children's books Lupu Lupettu Kull Kulur and Mingu received the Terramaxka Book Prize.

She is also  the recipient of 10 National Book Prize for Literature awards: Il-Linja l-Ħadra (2006), L-Interdett taħt is-Sodda (2012), Kulħadd ħalla isem warajh (2015), Il-Każ Kważi Kollu tal-Aħwa De Molizz (2010), Ir-Re Pankrazju jagħlaq mitt sena (2010), Jake Cassar (2015), Meta l-Milied ma Ġiex (2010), Kidane (2012), Il-Qtates ta' max-Xatt (2016) and Teresa (2017).

In 2021, Azzoppardi won a Terramaxka Prize for best translated work, for the book Ors fl-Ispazju.

References

External links 
 

1977 births
Living people
Maltese women poets
21st-century Maltese poets
21st-century Maltese women writers
People from St. Julian's, Malta
Maltese short story writers
French–Maltese translators
English–Maltese translators